Martin Bakes (born 8 February 1937) is an English former professional footballer who played as a left winger. Bakes made a total of 149 appearances in the English Football League between 1953 and 1963, scoring 12 goals.

Career
Born in Bradford, Bakes began his career in the youth team of Bradford City, before making his professional debut in the 1953–1954 season. Bakes later played for Scunthorpe United, before retiring in 1963.

External links

1937 births
Living people
English footballers
Bradford City A.F.C. players
Scunthorpe United F.C. players
English Football League players
Footballers from Bradford
Association football wingers